Dyspessa marikowskyi is a moth in the family Cossidae. It was described by Yakovlev in 2007. It is found in Kazakhstan.

The length of the forewings is about 10 mm. The forewings are light grey, the outer margin with a brown border with small dark spots at the veins.

References

Natural History Museum Lepidoptera generic names catalog

Moths described in 2007
Dyspessa
Moths of Asia